Amy Saunders  also known as Miss Behave, is a British-born producer, performer, comedian and curator. She is a self-taught sword swallower and performs in cabarets.

Career

Saunders is mostly known as a sword swallower. She has broken the Guinness world record for most swords swallowed by a woman three times. She first broke the record by swallowing five swords in London on 28 April 1999. She then swallowed six swords on the set of El Show de los Récords in Madrid on 27 November 2001. On 11 September 2004, she swallowed seven swords in London.

Saunders first began sword-swallowing while busking in bars in the West End of London in 1996. She started performance life in fetish clubs and then moved to freak shows as a sword swallower.

Since 2001, Saunders has been performing under the stage name of Miss Behave. She has been compared to Betty Boop and Marlene Dietrich, called "a live cartoon with a late night attitude." Industry website This Is Cabaret said that she "... imprints the evening with unapologetic raciness and sardonic mockery. Aggressive and confrontational, she always has a quick riposte to call your bluff."

Producer
Saunders has produced her own variety shows since 2008. She has created The Crack, Miss Behave's Variety Nighty, Miss Behave's Social Club, Pleasure Aid and Miss Behave's Game Show. In Variety Nighty, she incorporated Statler and Waldorf characters as in-house hecklers.

References

External links
Miss Behave Website

British comedians
British neo-burlesque performers
Sword swallowers
Actresses from London
Comedians from London
Living people
Year of birth missing (living people)
Place of birth missing (living people)